The 2020 Arizona House of Representatives election was held on November 3, 2020. Voters in each of Arizona's 30 legislative districts elected two state representatives to the Arizona House of Representatives. The election coincided with the elections for other offices, including the Presidency, U.S Senate, U.S. House of Representatives, and state senate. The primary election took place on August 4, 2020.

Predictions

Polling 
Each voter may select up to two candidates in two-member districts such as HD23; the top two vote-getters win the seats. Consequently, poll results have been displayed here as the accumulation of a candidate's first and second preferences and therefore sum to 200% instead of 100%.

House District 23

Results

District 1

District 2

District 3

District 4

District 5

District 6

District 7

District 8

District 9

District 10

District 11

District 12

District 13

District 14

District 15

District 16

District 17

District 18

District 19

District 20

District 21

District 22

District 23

District 24

District 25

District 26

District 27

District 28

District 29

District 30

Notes
 Percentages may not total 100% because of rounding.

See also
 2020 Arizona elections
 2020 Arizona Senate election

References

External links
 

House of Representatives
Arizona House of Representatives elections
Arizona House